María Auxiliadora is a Sector in the city of Santo Domingo in the Distrito Nacional of the Dominican Republic. This neighborhood is populated in particular by individuals from the lower middle class.

Sources 
Distrito Nacional sectors

Populated places in Santo Domingo